Bayramdüğün is a village in the Eskil District, Aksaray Province, Turkey. Its population is 380 (2021).

References

Villages in Eskil District